United States federal administrative law encompasses statutes, common law, and directives issued by the Office of Information and Regulatory Affairs in the Executive Office of the President, that together define the extent of powers and responsibilities held by administrative agencies of the United States government (both executive branch agencies and independent agencies). The executive, legislative, and judicial branches of the U.S. federal government cannot always directly perform their constitutional responsibilities. Specialized powers are therefore delegated to an agency, board, or commission. These administrative governmental bodies oversee and monitor activities in complex areas, such as commercial aviation, medical device manufacturing, and securities markets.

Justice Stephen Breyer defines administrative law in four parts. Namely, the legal rules and principles that: (1) define the authority and structure of administrative agencies; (2) specify the procedural formalities employed by agencies; (3) determine the validity of agency decisions; and (4) define the role of reviewing courts and other governmental entities in relation to administrative agencies.

U.S. federal agencies have the power to adjudicate, legislate, and enforce laws within their specific areas of delegated power.

Jurisdiction
The authority of federal administrative agencies stems from their organic statutes, and must be consistent with constitutional constraints and the scope of authority granted by statute.

Rulemaking

Federal administrative agencies, when granted the power to do so in a statutory grant of authority from Congress, may promulgate rules that have force of law. Agencies "legislate" through rulemaking—the power to promulgate (or issue) regulations. Such regulations are codified in the Code of Federal Regulations (CFR) and published in the Federal Register. Rules of lesser effect are published in a host of forms, including manuals for agency staff and for the public, circulars, bulletins, letter rulings, press releases, and the like.

Administrative law statutes governing rulemaking

Section 551 of the Administrative Procedure Act gives the following definitions:
 Rulemaking is "an agency process for formulating, amending, or repealing a rule."
 A rule in turn is "the whole or a part of an agency statement of general or particular applicability and future effect designed to implement, interpret, or prescribe law or policy."

The primary administrative law statutes and other laws that govern agency rule making include:
 The Administrative Procedure Act, 5 U.S.C. §§ 552 and 553
 The Housekeeping Act, 5 U.S.C. § 301, which gives heads of agencies authority to issue rules for agency employees
 The Regulatory Flexibility Act, 5 U.S.C. §§ 601 et seq., which requires agencies to consider the needs of small entities in rule making
 The Paperwork Reduction Act, 44 U.S.C. §§ 3501 et seq., which limits the power of an agency to collect information from the public
 The Congressional Review Act, 5 U.S.C. §§ 801–808, which gives Congress the authority to review and veto any agency regulation
 The Independent Offices Appropriations Act of 1952, 31 U.S.C. §§ 9701, which limits the power of agencies to set user fees
 Executive Order 12866, which requires agencies to use cost-benefit balancing in all regulatory actions

Scope and extent of rulemaking power

Limits on the power of agencies to promulgate regulations include:
 The regulation must lie within a grant of power from Congress, and that delegation must in turn be constitutional (courts almost never invalidate a regulation on this ground). The power must be granted in the agency's organic statute, and extends so far as legislative intent as fairly inferrable from the statutory language. Statutory grants of authority to agencies are generally construed more strictly than the "necessary and proper" power of Congress granted in Article I, section 8, clause 18 of the Constitution.
 The regulation must lie within that grant of rulemaking authority (in the extreme case, Congress sometimes includes an explicit limit on the agency's authority). Some agencies have power to promulgate both substantive rules as well as procedural rules; some (like the IRS, EEOC, and Patent and Trademark Office) may promulgate only procedural rules. When Congress grants that authority retroactively, courts carefully scrutinize the case, and sometimes bless the regulation, and sometimes invalidate it.
 The regulation must be promulgated with observance of the procedures required by the statutes set forth in the previous section. Among these procedures, one of the most important is the requirement that an agency set forth factual findings sufficient to support a rational basis or by procedures otherwise inadequate to meet the statutes listed above.

Agencies may not promulgate retroactive rules unless expressly granted such power by the agency's organic statute. Bowen v. Georgetown University Hospital, 

There is no broad prohibition against an agency's regulation that does not serve the "public convenience, interest, or necessity." The law presumes that rulemaking conducted with procedural safeguards of the statutes and Executive Orders noted above reflect a rational balancing of interests by the agency, and a court will strike down a regulation only for violation of those procedures.

Agencies are permitted to rely on rules in reaching their decisions rather than adjudicate, where the promulgation of the rules is within the agency's statutory authority, and the rules themselves are not arbitrary or capricious. Heckler v. Campbell, .

Agencies must abide by their own rules and regulations. Accardi v. Shaughnessy, .

Courts must defer to administrative agency interpretations of the authority granted to them by Congress (1) where the intent of Congress was ambiguous and (2) where the interpretation was reasonable or permissible. Chevron U.S.A., Inc. v. Natural Resources Defense Council, Inc., . Chevron is probably the most frequently cited case in American administrative law.

Type of rulemaking
There are five levels of rulemaking procedure:
 Formal rulemaking, which is rulemaking for which the organic statute requires that rules be "made on the record after opportunity for an agency hearing" (that is, a trial-type hearing that is taken down by a transcriptionist into the record and for which the APA prescribes particular procedures). The phrase "on the record" is required to trigger requirements for formal rulemaking; simply requiring that rules be made "after a hearing" does not trigger the requirements of formal rulemaking.
 Informal rulemaking, also known as "notice-and-comment rulemaking", which is rulemaking for which no procedural requirements are prescribed in the organic statute, and for which the APA requires only notice and comment.
 Hybrid rulemaking, which is rulemaking for which particular procedural requirements beyond notice and comment are prescribed, but does not rise to the level of formal rulemaking.
 Negotiated rulemaking under 5 U.S.C. §§ 561–570 of the Administrative Procedure Act.
 Publication rulemaking, or "nonlegislative rulemaking", typically for procedural rules, interpretative rules, or matters relating to agency management or personnel, that an agency may promulgate by publication in the Federal Register.

Nonlegislative rules: interpretative rules, "statements of policy" and guidance 

"Nonlegislative rules" include three main classes:
 interpretative rules under 5 U.S.C. § 553(b)(A), which interpret ambiguities in binding rules, but themselves have only the limited binding effect of Skidmore deference.
 "statements of general policy", purely hortatory rules directed to the public, also promulgated under 5 U.S.C. § 553(b)(A). Typically, a "statement of policy" uses words like "should" instead of "must" or "shall", to advise the public of an agency's preference that the agency does not intend to enforce.
 "housekeeping rules" or "matters relating to agency management or personnel" directed to agency staff, including agency staff manuals, staff instructions and memoranda, and the like, promulgated under 5 U.S.C. § 301 and authority delegated to agency heads.
A class called "guidance" includes all rules not promulgated by legislative procedure. Such rules may be published as guidance, guidelines, agency staff manuals, staff instructions, opinion letters, interpretive memoranda, policy statements, guidance manuals for the public, circulars, bulletins, advisories, press releases stating agency position, and the like. The class of "guidance" is almost, but not exactly, coextensive with the union of the sets of interpretative rules, general statements of policy, and housekeeping rules.

Agency interpretations: § 553(d) "interpretative rules" vs. Chevron/Auer interpretations

Every statute and regulation has some lingering ambiguity. Someone has to have authority to adopt some interpretation, and do so with a minimum of procedural delay. So the law grants every agency the authority to promulgate interpretative rules, and to do so with minimal procedural fuss. By default, most interpretations slot into the *interpretative rule" category of 5 U.S.C. § 553(b).

If an interpretation satisfies a long list of criteria, then the interpretation is binding on parties before the agency, courts, and the agency itself, under Chevron U.S.A. Inc. v. Natural Resources Defense Council, Inc. (for agency interpretations of statute) or Auer v. Robbins (for agency interpretations of regulations). (The inquiries under Chevron and Auer are slightly different. But the analytical similarities overshadow the differences. For this short article, we will gloss over the differences, and treat Chevron and Auer together.)

Any interpretation that fails any one of the Chevron/Auer eligibility bullets from the list below falls into the residual category of "interpretative rule".

Interpretative rules and Skidmore deference

Fundamentally, the § 553(b) "interpretative" exemption from notice and comment is a rule of necessity—essentially all laws have some ambiguity, that ambiguity has to be interpreted, and (for public-facing substantive rules) the agency is the party that can do so expeditiously and fairly. Deference follows to the degree the agency demonstrates fairness and diligence in developing its interpretation (under Chevron, Auer, or Skidmore v. Swift & Co., as appropriate).

The quid pro quo for an agency's choice to exercise the "interpretative" option, and forego the formalities required for legislative rulemaking or for Chevron or Auer deference, is that the agency has very little enhanced power to enforce its interpretation. If a party challenges the agency's interpretation, an agency's invocation of the "interpretative" exemption surrenders any claim to heightened Chevron or Auer deference, and the interpretation falls into the residual category, under which a court gives Skidmore deference to an agency's informed position:

As a practical matter, an agency operates under the agency's interpretative rules. The law permits parties before the agency to argue alternative interpretations, and under the law, agencies are supposed to respond to the arguments, and not foreclose alternatives suggested by parties. But as a practical matter, agencies seldom give anything more than short shrift consideration to alternatives. On judicial review, the practical reality is that a court is most likely to agree with the agency, under Skidmore deference. But Skidmore deference is only as strong as the quality of the agency's analysis, and courts regularly overturn "interpretative" rules.

Chevron/Auer: Formal interpretations of statutes or regulations

Some agency interpretations are binding on parties and the courts, under Chevron deference:

But an agency has to earn this deference; it is far from automatic. When an agency interprets its own organic statute (for Chevron) or a regulation that it promulgated (under Auer), and the interpretation meets all the following prerequisites, only then does the agency receive the high deference of Chevron or Auer.

 Under "Chevron step zero", an agency only receives deference when interpreting a statute or rule within its delegated authority, and that it is charged with administering.
 Under "Chevron/Auer step one", an agency only earns high Chevron/Auer deference for an interpretation where there is an ambiguity in words in the statute or rule, or a delegation of authority by Congress to fill gaps.
 Under "Chevron/Auer step two", an agency interpretation only receives deference if it is a "reasonable" interpretation of the statutory language considered with statements of Congressional intent, and is supported by a reasonable explanation.
In addition to the three classical steps, an agency must observe additional procedural formalities:
 Not every silence is a Chevron/Auer "gap": the agency must be charged with filling the gap. Silences without a Congressional rulemaking charge are just silences, leaving the underlying default in place.
 The interpretation or implementing regulation at issue must tend to resolve the precise ambiguity or fill the precise gap: overly imprecise rules or interpretations do not receive Chevron or Auer deference.
 High Chevron/Auer deference requires that the agency publish its interpretation with some degree of formality, including any procedural formalities that Congress specifies, either for agencies in general (such as the Paperwork Reduction Act), or specific to the agency—while full-blown notice and comment is not a prerequisite to Chevron/Auer deference, informal statements of agency interpretation are not entitled to Chevron/Auer deference.
 High Chevron/Auer deference requires some level of consistency by the agency.
 An agency can lose Chevron/Auer deference in a specific case if its adjudicatory procedures in that case were haphazard.
 Chevron/Auer only applies to an agency's interpretations of a statute or rule reached on its own reasoned decisionmaking, not to interpretations of Congressional intent or case law, which are the purview of the judicial branch.
 Congress may specify procedures that an agency must use in its gap-filling—a delegation of authority to make "rules" invokes the § 553 defaults for procedure, while a charge to promulgate "regulations" implicates legislative procedure.

"Interpretative" rules and "shortcut procedure" exemption of § 553(b)

An "interpretative" rule sets out the agency's interpretation of a statute or rule, without altering rights or obligations. If the interpretation fails at least one of the Chevron/Auer criteria, then the interpretation falls into the category of "interpretative rule" which binds only the agency itself, and is entitled to at most Skidmore deference.

Availability of the § 553(b) "interpretative" exemption

The line for permissible exercise of the § 553(b) "interpretative" exemption is blurry—courts and treatise writers uniformly complain about this. The most basic requirement for the "interpretative" exemption is that the agency "interpret" a validly promulgated law (statute or regulation), by following a recognizable interpretative path originally set out by the statute or regulation. An agency may promulgate an "interpretative" rule "only if the agency's position can be characterized as an 'interpretation' of a statute or legislative regulation rather than as an exercise of independent policymaking authority." Mere "consistency" (in the sense of "absence of clash") is insufficient. Most "gap filling" is beyond the scope of *interpretative" authority. A valid interpretative rule merely explains, but does not add to or alter, the law that already exists in the form of a statute or legislative rule. An "interpretative" rule cannot create a new requirement, carve-out, or exception from whole cloth. If the rule changes "individual rights and obligations" (rather than resolving ambiguity), the rule requires legislative procedure.

An agency may promulgate interpretative rules outside the scope of its rule making authority. Where an agency can only issue legislative rules pursuant to an express grant of authority from Congress, an agency may (and is encouraged to) issue advisory interpretations to guide the public.

If an agency elects the "interpretative" shortcut, there are almost no procedural requirements, beyond the publication required by 5 U.S.C. § 552 and § 552(d). The decision maker must ensure that there is indeed an ambiguity that is not resolved by any binding law, but if the ambiguity exists, the decision maker simply interprets as best he or she may. If the issue is outside the agency's scope of rule making authority, the agency must follow the agency or courts that do have authority on that specific issue.

Consequence of the "interpretative" exemption

In return for the privilege of bypassing rule making procedure, the agency risks loss of binding effect for an interpretative rule. "An agency issuing an interpretative rule ... may well intend that its interpretation bind its own personnel and may expect compliance from regulated individuals or entities. Nonetheless, the agency cannot expect the interpretation to be binding in court; because it does not have the force of law, parties can challenge the interpretation." Many courts have characterized interpretative rules as only "hortatory" and "lacking force of law".

In proceedings before the agency, a party may advance alternative positions or interpretations, and the agency must address them, without relying on an interpretative rule as the last word. But as a practical matter, agencies tend to enforce their interpretative rules until forced to concede error, and parties simply acquiesce until the costs of the agency's interpretation exceed the cost of court litigation.

Interpretative rules are binding on agency employees, including its administrative law judges (ALJs). If an interpretative rule (say, a provision of an agency staff manual, or memorandum to agency staff, or interpretation in a Federal Register rulemaking notice) sets a "floor" under the rights of a party, individual employees have no discretion to back out of the agency's interpretation or create ad hoc exceptions adverse to the party.

On judicial review, the effect of an interpretative rule was explained by the Eighth Circuit, discussing "well-settled principles of administrative law":

“Statements of policy”

"Statements of policy" are even weaker statements than "interpretative" rules. Agencies use them to express agency preferences, but with no binding effect. Policy statements are "tentative intentions", nonbinding rules of thumb, suggestions for conduct, and tentative indications of an agency's hopes. Policy statements have no binding effect. A policy statement "genuinely leaves the agency and its decisionmakers free to exercise discretion", and "a statement of policy may not have a present effect: a 'general statement of policy' is one that does not impose any rights and obligations".

Agencies likewise use "policy statements" to offer a unilateral quid pro quo or set a floor for agency procedure ("If you the public do X, we the agency promise favorable outcome Y. If you don't do X, you can still convince us to do Y by arguing the controlling law.").

A near-certain indicator of a "statement of policy" is the word "should" rather than "must".

Agency policy statements are not binding on courts, and therefore receive no Chevron deference, not even weak Skidmore deference.

Guidance

"Guidance" is a residual category for any rule issued by an agency but not in a formally-promulgated regulation. Most non-Chevron interpretative rules, and most general statements of policy, are issued as guidance.

Only three classes of law administered by agencies are binding against members of the public: statute (as interpreted by the courts), regulations, and common law. Against members of the public, the default rule, embodied in the Administrative Procedure Act, 5 U.S.C. § 553, and elaborated in the Good Guidance Bulletin, is that subregualtory guidance documents do not have force of law, and do not bind the public. Perez v. Mortgage Bankers Association, 575 U.S. 82 (2015); e.g., 15 C.F.R. § 29.2. Nothing in agency guidance documents is binding against members of the public, except—

 Quotes of statutes or regulations (but they are binding because they are statutes or regulations, not because they are in the guidance document)
 Interpretations of genuine ambiguity in statute or regulation—until those interpretations have been confirmed by an Article III court, they are just the agency's best current interpretive guess, and are not firmly binding. In most cases, a member of the public is permitted to argue for an alternative interpretation (though of course the agency will often not entertain the suggestion; they may have to go to court to get it recognized).
 For this purpose, silence is not ambiguity. An agency cannot point to a silence in statute or regulation, and claim that that silence is license to gap fill the silence in any way that creates new obligations on the public or carves out from an obligation of the agency. Only statutes and regulations are binding against the public; therefore subregulatory guidance cannot have independent binding effect against any member of the public, it can only interpret ambiguity.
 Against agency personnel in ex parte matters (that is, where an agency acts solely to confine its own discretion with no adverse effect on any party), guidance is binding against agency personnel. Guidance against the agency arises as a permissive power under the Housekeeping Act, 5 U.S.C. § 301, and a long line of Supreme Court cases originating with Accardi v. Shaughnessy, 347 U.S. 260 (1954). Classes of binding statements include:
 Sentences that state mandatory actions of agency personnel, for example "Agency staff must ..." or "The agency will ...—an agency can bind its employees via an employee manual, but cannot bind the public.
 When an agency's guidance promises "If a party before the agency does x, the agency promises to do (favorable) y." The agency is bound to keep such promises.
 When an agency guidance document interprets an ambiguity in a way that is favorable to a party before the agency in an ex parte proceeding, the party can rely on it, and no agency employee can back out.

An agency can change its guidance with very little procedure (unlike a regulation), but as long as the guidance reads as it does, parties are entitled to rely on it for the three classes of promises listed above.
 
In the late 1990s and early 2000s, many agencies attempted to bypass the APA's requirements for rulemaking by tucking rules that went beyond interpretation of ambiguity into informal documents like agency staff manuals and the like. This is simply illegal. The Executive Office of the President stepped in to stop bootleg rulemaking in 2007, and forbade this practice. Some agencies, for example, the U.S. Patent and Trademark Office, have nonetheless continued to defy the law, and state their formal refusal to implement the President's directive.

Review by Office of Management and Budget and Congressional Review Act 

Executive Order 12866, which was issued in 1993, requires agencies (other than independent agencies) to submit proposed rules for reviews by the Office of Information and Regulatory Affairs if the rule meets certain criteria. Rules that are "economically significant" (meeting the criteria of "an annual effect on the economy of $100 million or more or adversely affect in a material way the economy") require a cost-benefit analysis.

The Congressional Review Act passed in 1996 created a category of major rules, which are those that OIRA determines result in either: (1) "an annual effect on the economy of $100,000,000", (2) "a major increase in costs or prices for consumers, individual industries, Federal, State, or local government agencies, or geographic regions", or (3) "significant adverse effects on competition, employment, investment, productivity, innovation, or on the ability of United States-based enterprises to compete with foreign-based enterprises in domestic and export markets". If the rule is major, an additional report must be provided to congressional committees.

About 2,500 to 4,000 rules are published per year.  Of those, in 2012, 68% were classified as Routine/Info/Other while the remainder were Significant/Substantive. From 1997 to 2012, the number of major rules for Congressional Review Act purposes has ranged from 100 (2010) to 50 (2002).

Adjudication

Section 551 of the Administrative Procedure Act gives the following definitions:
 Adjudication is "an agency process for the formulation of an order";
 An order in turn is "the whole or part of a final disposition ... of an agency in a matter other than rule making but including licensing".

Right to a hearing
There are two ways that an individual can attain the right to a hearing in an adjudicative proceeding. First, the Due Process Clause of the 5th Amendment or 14th Amendment can require that a hearing be held if the interest that is being adjudicated is sufficiently important or if, without a hearing, there is a strong chance that the petitioner will be erroneously denied that interest. A hearing can also be required if a statute somehow mandates the agency to hold formal hearings when adjudicating certain issues.

Conclusion 
The adjudication will typically be completed with a written report containing findings of fact and conclusions of law, both at the state and federal level. If the affected does not wish to contest the action, a consent order may be published allowing for the hearing to be bypassed.

Federal tribunals

Determining whether rulemaking or adjudication is appropriate

The Administrative Procedure Act puts "adjudication" and "rulemaking" on opposite sides of a "dichotomy".

Agency actions are divided into two broad categories discussed above, rulemaking and adjudication. Because actions by rulemaking affect many parties, rulemaking procedures are designed to ensure public participation, and are therefore more cumbersome, except that the agency is permitted to seek comment by publication of notice, without soliciting the views of specific parties.

Adjudication decisions may become precedent that binds future parties, so the transition zone between the scope of issues requiring rulemaking and the scope of issues that may be determined by case-by-case adjudication is very hazy.

The classical test for the dividing line is seen in the contrast between two cases decided a few years apart, both involving taxes levied by the city of Denver Colorado. In 1908, in Londoner v. City and County of Denver, a tax levied on residents of a particular street was held to be an adjudication, and the Supreme Court ordered the city to do a "do over", because the residents of the street were not given sufficient opportunity to be heard. Then, in 1915, in Bi-Metallic Investment Co. v. State Board of Equalization, a tax levied on the entire city of Denver was held to be rulemaking, and the city's action of imposing the tax was affirmed.

Factors tending to make an act adjudicative in nature:
Involving a small number of people
Individuals involved are specially affected by the act
Decision based on the facts of an individual case, rather than policy concerns

For most agencies, the choice of whether to promulgate rules or proceed by common law adjudicative decisions rests in the informed discretion of agencies. SEC v. Chenery Corp.,  (Dissenting opinion arguing that the decision permitted agencies to rule arbitrarily, without law). Agencies may also announce new policies in the course of such adjudications. Some agencies' organic statutes obligate the agency to use rulemaking, for example, the U.S. Patent and Trademark Office, 35 U.S.C. § 2(b)(2)(B).

Judicial review 
A party aggrieved by an agency action (either rulemaking or adjudication) may seek judicial review (that is, sue) as provided by an agency's organic statute or by §§ 701-706 of the Administrative Procedure Act.

Studies of judicial review typically find that 70% of agency rules are upheld with the Supreme Court upholding 91% of rules; a 2011 empirical study of judicial review found that 76% were upheld, although the D.C. Circuit, which hears many administrative law cases, has been found less deferential than other courts.

See also
 United Kingdom administrative law
 Public service law in the United States
 Administrative law judge
 List of significant administrative law cases, e.g. Chevron U.S.A., Inc. v. Natural Resources Defense Council, Inc.

Notes

Further reading
 Administrative Law Review is the official quarterly publication of the American Bar Association's Section on Administrative Law and Regulatory Practice, published in coordination with American University Washington College of Law.
 The Journal of the National Association of Administrative Law Judiciary is a publication of the National Association of Administrative Law Judiciary, published in coordination with Pepperdine University School of Law.
 The Texas Tech Administrative Law Journal specializes in administrative law topics.
 William Funk (2006). Administrative Procedure and Practice: Problems and Cases, Thomson West, 3rd ed.
 William Funk (2006). Administrative Law: Examples and Explanations, Aspen Publishers, 2nd ed.
 David E. Boundy, The PTAB is Not an Article III Court, Part 1: A Primer on Federal Agency Rulemaking, American Bar Ass’n, Landslide, vol. 10 no. 2 pp. 9–13 (Nov-Dec 2017) here or here

External links
 ABA Section of Administrative Law & Regulatory Practice
 LII Law about administrative law
 Administrative Law and Procedure, legal definitions
 Federal Administrative Law: A Brief Overview, Law Librarians' Society of Washington, D.C.
 Digital Commons Network: Administrative Law